Mirandópolis is a municipality in the state of São Paulo in Brazil. The population is 29,706 (2020 est.) in an area of 918 km². The elevation is 429 m. Nickname is Cidade labor (labor city), and Demonymis mirandopolense.

References

Municipalities in São Paulo (state)